Robert D. Weinhardt (born December 8, 1985) is a former professional baseball relief pitcher. He went to college at Oklahoma State.

Detroit Tigers
He was called up to the majors for the first time on July 7, 2010. Weinhardt pitched an inning, giving up one run in his first career outing against the Baltimore Orioles. On July 9, 2010, he entered the game for Justin Verlander with the bases loaded, and induced a double play to get out of the inning. The next inning he got his first career strikeouts, finishing the day with 1 innings pitched and two strikeouts. On July 30, he earned his first career win against the Boston Red Sox.

On May 24, 2011, Weinhardt was designated for assignment.

Weinhardt ultimately remained in the Tigers organization, finishing the 2011 season with the Triple-A Toledo Mud Hens.  Weinhardt began the 2012 season with the Double-A Erie SeaWolves.

He became a free agent from the Sugar Land Skeeters after the 2016 season.

References

External links

1985 births
Living people
Gulf Coast Tigers players
Lakeland Flying Tigers players
Erie SeaWolves players
Connecticut Tigers players
Toledo Mud Hens players
Detroit Tigers players
Oklahoma State Cowboys baseball players
Baseball players from Chicago
Peoria Javelinas players
Senadores de San Juan players
Sugar Land Skeeters players
Major League Baseball pitchers
St. Cloud River Bats players